The 2015–16 Macedonian Third Football League was a 24th season of the third-tier football league in the Republic of Macedonia, since its establishment. It began on 29 August 2015 and ended on 22 May 2016.

North

Teams

League table

South

Teams

1 Mladost Udovo was replaced Crvena Zvezda Josifovo, after that team was withdraw due to financial reasons.

League table

East

Teams

League table

West

Teams

League table

Southwest

Teams

League table

See also
2015–16 Macedonian Football Cup
2015–16 Macedonian First Football League
2015–16 Macedonian Second Football League

References

External links
MacedonianFootball.com
Football Federation of Macedonia 

Macedonia 3
3
Macedonian Third Football League seasons